The Carmel Pine Cone is a weekly newspaper serving the city of Carmel-by-the-Sea and the surrounding Monterey Peninsula, Carmel Valley and Big Sur region of Monterey County in central California. Despite not having a digital presence, a PDF of the printed newspaper is available weekly online. The Pine Cone celebrated its centennial edition in February 2015.

History 
The Pine Cone was founded in 1915 by William Overstreet who proclaimed in the first four-page edition of 300 copies, "we are here to stay!" By 1924, the Pine Cone moved into the De Yoe Building, opposite of the Carmel Post Office. Overstreet sold the paper in 1926 to J.A. Easton. The offices move to the Goold Building from 1970 to 2000.

In 1926 writer and activist Perry Newberry was the editor of the Pine Cone and successfully ran for the office of city trustee, the equivalent of mayor. By 1929 members of the local arts community, including Argyll Campbell were elected to the Carmel Board of Trustees at the same time and most notably approved city zoning ordinance 96 designed to protect the thriving artist colony from unchecked development and commercialization. Newberry was the paper's co-publisher until he sold it in 1935. There is a street in Carmel, “Perry Newberry” named after him.

From the Ella Winter page: "Carmel was sharply divided between conservative and liberal factions; the latter quickly coalesced around the Steffens, who publicly debated the most controversial topics. The Irish poet and folklorist Ella Young, as well as the local press, described the relaxed social intercourse in this counterculture world.  In 1928 the Steffens helped to create The Carmelite, a publication that was offered as an alternative to the town’s somewhat stodgy local paper, the Carmel Pine Cone."

Pine Cone publisher Allman Cook announced on August 21, 1969, that he'd sold the newspaper to John Mustard and Wayne Everton, owners and publishers of The Squire, a community weekly in Lafayette. Everton became the general manager, and Mustard, the publisher

In 1983, the Pine Cone was converted from a paid newspaper to a free one by owners Al and Judy Eisner. Veteran CBS and NBC network news producer Paul Miller became publisher in 1997. In 2005, after failing to convince city officials to rezone a potential site for the Pine Cone's operation, he moved the paper's production offices to Pacific Grove, while maintaining a reduced news staff in downtown Carmel. The paper is no longer made in Carmel, as the last Carmel office was closed in 2009.

In 2007, the paper began offering an Adobe Acrobat (*.PDF) version of its complete newspaper on the Internet, which has attracted more than 9,000 subscribers, in addition to the newspaper's weekly print circulation of approximately 19,000.

Awards 
Every year, the paper gives Golden Pine Cone awards to local organizations, businesses, and individuals in categories related to arts, recreation, and dining.

References

External links

1915 establishments in California
Weekly newspapers published in California